Stanley William Newnham (7 April 1910 – 2 December 1985) was an English first-class cricketer active 1932 who played for Surrey. He was born in New Cross, London; died in Rhuddlan, Flintshire.

References

1910 births
1985 deaths
English cricketers
Surrey cricketers